Ângelo "Angelim" Bonfietti, also commonly known simply as Angelim (6 August 1926 – 10 October 2004) was a Brazilian basketball player who competed in the 1952 Summer Olympics and in the 1956 Summer Olympics.

References

1926 births
2004 deaths
Brazilian men's basketball players
1954 FIBA World Championship players
Olympic basketball players of Brazil
Basketball players at the 1952 Summer Olympics
Basketball players at the 1956 Summer Olympics
1950 FIBA World Championship players